Entre Nous may refer to:

 Entre Nous (film), 1983 French film
 "Entre Nous" (Rush song), 1980 song by Rush
 "Entre nous" (Chimène Badi song), 2003 song by Chimène Badi
 Entre Nous (journal), European journal for sexual and reproductive health